Greatest Hits is a greatest hits album by Martha and the Vandellas, released by the Motown's Gordy label in 1966. Included are popular Vandellas hits such as "Dancing in the Street", "Come and Get These Memories", "Heat Wave", "Live Wire", "Wild One", "Nowhere to Run", and "Quicksand" and featured non-album singles "You've Been in Love Too Long", "Love (Makes Me Do Foolish Things)" and "In My Lonely Room"

A new track, "My Baby Loves Me" features The Andantes and the Four Tops on background vocals. "My Baby Loves Me" was a Top 40 Billboard Hot 100 single in 1966, as well as a Top 5 Billboard R&B Singles chart hit.

Track listing

Notes 

Martha and the Vandellas albums
Albums produced by William "Mickey" Stevenson
Albums produced by Brian Holland
Albums produced by Lamont Dozier
1966 greatest hits albums
Gordy Records compilation albums
Albums produced by Edward Holland Jr.
Albums recorded at Hitsville U.S.A.